The Navy Civilian Service Achievement Medal is awarded to Department of the Navy and U.S. Marine Corps civilians who, while serving in a capacity within the Navy or Maine Corps, are to be recognized for sustained performance or specific achievement of a superlative nature at the equivalent level of the Navy and Marine Corps Achievement Medal awarded to military personnel.

The award consists of a certificate and citation signed by the activity head, the medal on a suspension ribbon, and a lapel emblem. The award is the fifth highest Navy civilian award, ranking just behind the Navy Civilian Service Commendation Medal, and before the Navy Certificate of Achievement. The approval authority for the award is commanders in the rank of O-5 and above and civilians in equivalent positions and above. The first known presentations were to Sara Givens and Kaitlyn Owens at Naval Support Activity Naples, Italy, Jan. 16, 2019

Medal and ribbon description

The medal's overall shape is that of a bronze circle, but laurel leaves extend slightly from the sides of both the obverse and revers. In the center of the bronze laurel wreath on the obverse is a fouled anchor. This anchor is adapted from the United States Navy and Marine Corps Achievement Medal. This is to denote the award as being presented on behalf of the Navy or Marine Corps, and to parallel the equivalent award for military service members. The laurel wreaths is emblematic of achievement and honor.

Within the laurel wreath border on the reverse, arched across the top, are the words "Honor Courage Commitment." In the lower center is the stacked inscription "Department of the Navy Civilian Service Achievement"

The colors of the ribbon are myrtle green with three orange stripes. These colors are consistent with the equivalent award for military service members (the Navy and Marine Corps Achievement Medal).

Award Recipients
Sara Givens, Naval Support Activity Naples, Italy, Jan. 16, 2019
Kaitlyn Owens, Naval Support Activity Naples, Italy, Jan. 16, 2019
Ruben R. Luevano, Naval Air Weapons Station, China Lake, February 2020
Dené Braswell, SCMC, Marine Corps Logistics Command, MCLB Albany GA, 2022
Wendy Johnson, SCMC, Marine Corps Logistics Command, MCLB Albany GA, 2022
Michele Harris, SCMC, Marine Corps Logistics Command, MCLB Albany GA, 2022
Sara Truver Johnson, SCMC, Marine Corps Logistics Command, MCLB Albany GA, 2022
Essic Stroman, SCMC, Marine Corps Logistics Command, MCLB Albany GA, 2022
Daniel R. Erdmann, SCMC, Marine Corps Logistics Command, MCLB Albany GA, 2022
Noah Veth, NAVFAC NW, Bangor WA, June 16, 2022
Tatiana A. Vayner, Commander, NAVY Region Northwest, Bangor WA, August 19, 2022
Pamela R. Smith, Naval Support Activity Millington, TN, August 22, 2022
William Y. Lee, Naval Facilities Engineering Systems Command, (NAVFAC) Southwest, Monterey, CA. June 28, 2022
Roy R. Carius, Naval Facilities Engineering Systems Command, (NAVFAC) Southwest, Monterey, CA. June 28, 2022
Leon J. Martinelli, Naval Facilities Engineering Systems Command, (NAVFAC) Southwest, Monterey, CA. June 28, 2022
Sam Faavesi, Naval Facilities Engineering Systems Command, (NAVFAC) Southwest, Monterey, CA. June 28, 2022
Sarah Jane F. McLaughlin, MCIPAC-MCB Contracting Office, Okinawa, Japan. September 27, 2022
Hunter R. Belcher, Naval Base Point Loma, San Diego, CA. September 30, 2022
Brett Smith, Navy Region Mid-Atlantic Fire & Emergency Services (CNIC) NAS Oceana, VA.  December 6th, 2022
 Richard V. Hobson, Naval Base Point Loma (CNRSW), San Diego, CA. December 15, 2022 
 Michael Daley, Naval Base Point Loma (CNRSW), San Diego, CA. December 15, 2022
 Richard Torres, Naval Base Point Loma (CNRSW), San Diego, CA. December 15, 2022
 Aubrey H. Lozano, Naval Base Point Loma (CNRSW), San Diego, CA. December 15, 2022
 Michael C. Walrond, Submarine Learning Center, Groton, CT. January 9, 2022
 James R. Gregg, Naval Submarine School, Groton, CT. January 19, 2022
 Joseph A. Van Gorp, NAVSUP Fleet Logistics Center, Sigonella, Italy. June 21, 2021
 Jill E. Ray, Puget Sound Naval Shipyard (PSNS), Bremerton WA. February 22, 2023

References

Awards and decorations of the United States Department of Defense
Awards and decorations of the United States Navy